Everyday Chemistry is a remix album that was made available as a free digital download on 9 September 2009. The album was released along with a story of anonymous authorship. It mashes up various songs from the Beatles' individual solo careers, including tracks from 27 albums. The album portrays itself as being taken from an alternate universe in which the Beatles had not broken up.

Context
The album was first posted on the website thebeatlesneverbrokeup.com, accompanied by a short story written by an anonymous person under the pen name "James Richards" (a pseudonym drawn from the legal first names of Paul McCartney and Ringo Starr, the two surviving Beatles, who were born James Paul McCartney and Richard Starkey respectively). Richards describes meeting a man named Jonas who lives in a parallel universe in which the Beatles never broke up. Jonas and Richards both discussed their enjoyment of the Beatles, and just before leaving the parallel universe and travelling back to his own, Richards stole a cassette tape containing one of The Beatles' albums from that timeline. Richards denied that the album was composed of mashups, reasoning that "even though in the alternate universe the Beatles hadn't broken up, that didn't mean their future music ideas disappeared".

Given the release of the album coincided with the release of The Beatles remastered albums in stereo and mono, as well as the release of The Beatles: Rock Band, and that no action has been taken against the album for copyright infringement, it can be surmised that the release was covertly sanctioned by Apple Records.

Track listing

Samples

"Four Guys"
 "I'm Moving On" (John Lennon)
 "Band on the Run" (Paul McCartney)
 "When We Was Fab" (George Harrison)
 "Vertical Man" (Ringo Starr)
 "Beatlemania In Action" (The Beatles' Story) 
 "We were four guys ... that's all (Interview Anthology 1)" (The Beatles)

"Talking to Myself"
 "I'm Losing You" (John Lennon)
 "Uncle Albert/Admiral Halsey" (Paul McCartney)
 "Stuck Inside a Cloud" (George Harrison)
 "Early 1970" (Ringo Starr)

"Anybody Else"
 "One Day (At a Time)" (John Lennon)
 "Somedays" (Paul McCartney)
 "Ballad of Sir Frankie Crisp (Let It Roll)" (George Harrison)
 "Monkey See – Monkey Do" (Ringo Starr)

"Sick to Death"
 "Gimme Some Truth" (John Lennon)
 'No More Lonely Nights (playout version)" (Paul McCartney)
 "Between the Devil and the Deep Blue Sea" (George Harrison)
 "All By Myself" (Ringo Starr)

"Jenn"
 "God Save Oz" (John Lennon)
 "Jet" (Paul McCartney)
 "Teardrops" (Harrison)
 "Hard Times" (Ringo Starr)

"I'm Just Sitting Here"
 "Watching the Wheels" (John Lennon)
 "Call Me Back Again " (Paul McCartney)
 "Give Me Love (Give Me Peace on Earth)" (George Harrison)
 "Loser's Lounge" (Ringo Starr)

"Soldier Boy"
 "Isolation" (John Lennon)
 "Phil and John 1" (John Lennon)
 "Listen to What the Man Said" (Paul McCartney)
 "Woman Don't You Cry For Me" (George Harrison)
 "I Don't Believe You" (Ringo Starr)
"John Lennon Becomes A DJ For A Day At KHJ Radio 27 September 1974"  (and now back to your local station) (John Lennon)

"Over the Ocean"
 "You Are Here" (John Lennon)
 "Heather" (Paul McCartney)
 "I Dig Love" (George Harrison)
 "Marwa Blues" (George Harrison)
 "Back Off Boogaloo" (Ringo Starr)

"Days Like These"
 "Nobody Told Me" (John Lennon)
"Write Away" (Paul McCartney)
 "Soft-Hearted Hana" (George Harrison)
"Christmas Eve" (Ringo Starr)

"Saturday Night"
 "Cold Turkey" (John Lennon)
 "Night Out" (Paul McCartney)
 "P2 Vatican Blues (Last Saturday Night)" (George Harrison)
"Runaways" (Ringo Starr)

"Mr. Gator's Swamp Jamboree"
"Sunday Bloody Sunday" (John Lennon)
 "Momma Miss America" (Paul McCartney)
"Tired of Midnight Blue" (George Harrison)
 "$15 Draw" (Ringo Starr)

See also
Works that explore similar concepts
The Black Album
"The Twelfth Album"

References

2009 remix albums
Mashup albums
Self-released albums
The Beatles bootleg recordings
The Beatles remix albums
Unofficial remix albums
Alternate history fandom
Works of unknown authorship
Musical hoaxes